Euprionocera geminipuncta is a moth in the family Depressariidae, and the only species in the genus Euprionocera. It was described by Turner in 1896 and is found in Australia, where it has been recorded from New South Wales.

The wingspan is about 27 mm. The forewings are light pink, with rows of minute dark grey dots on the veins and a small blackish subdorsal dot near the base. The discal stigmata are blackish, the first moderate and the second large. The hindwings are pale pink, anteriorly whitish-suffused.

References

Moths described in 1896
Depressariinae
Gelechioidea